Frank Wilcoxon (2 September 1892 – 18 November 1965) was a chemist and statistician, known for the development of several statistical tests.

Education and career 
Frank Wilcoxon was born to American parents on 2 September 1892 in County Cork, Ireland. He grew up in Catskill, New York, but received part of his education in England. In 1917, he graduated from Pennsylvania Military College with a B.Sc. After the First World War he entered graduate studies, first at Rutgers University, where he was awarded an M.S. in chemistry in 1921, and then at Cornell University, gaining a Ph.D. in physical chemistry in 1924.

Wilcoxon entered a research career, working at the Boyce Thompson Institute for Plant Research from 1925 to 1941. He then moved to the Atlas Powder Company, where he designed and directed the Control Laboratory, before joining the American Cyanamid Company in 1943. During this time he developed an interest in inferential statistics through the study of Ronald Fisher's 1925 text, Statistical Methods for Research Workers. He retired in 1957.

Research 
Over his career Wilcoxon published over 70 papers. His most well-known paper contained the two new statistical tests that still bear his name, the Wilcoxon rank-sum test and the Wilcoxon signed-rank test. These are non-parametric alternatives to the unpaired and paired Student's t-tests respectively. He died on November 18, 1965.

References

External links
 Brookes, E. Bruce (2001) Tales of Statisticians: Frank Wilcoxon. In Acquiring Statistics:Techniques and Concepts for Historians. (accessed 26 November 2005)
 Portraits of Statisticians Frank Wilcoxon

1892 births
1965 deaths
American physical chemists
American statisticians
Irish statisticians
Widener University alumni
Rutgers University alumni
Cornell University alumni
Fellows of the American Statistical Association